The Mendoza Regional Faculty or FRM is one branch of the National Technological University (Castilian: Universidad Tecnológica Nacional - Facultad Regional Mendoza (UTN-FRM)). It is located in Mendoza the capital city of Mendoza in Argentina, and it offers academic degrees in the following fields:

Engineer's degrees
 Electronic Engineering
 Civil engineering
 Chemical engineering
 Systems engineering
 Electro-mechanical engineering

Licentiate degrees
 Safety engineering Licenciate
 Business Administration Licenciate
 Educational technology Licenciate
 Tourism Business Administration Licenciate
 Enology Licenciate

Technician degrees
 Computer Programming technician
 Tourism technician
 Hotel technician
 Enology technician
 Safety technician

See also
UTN
Mendoza Province

External links
Facultad Regional Mendoza 

Universities in Mendoza Province
Engineering universities and colleges in Argentina
Technical universities and colleges in Argentina
Buildings and structures in Mendoza, Argentina